Muhammad Shoaib Khan Afridi is a Pakistani politician who is member-elect of the Provincial Assembly of Khyber Pakhtunkhwa.

Political career
Afridi contested 2019 Khyber Pakhtunkhwa provincial election on 20 July 2019 from constituency PK-115 (ex-Frontier Regions) on the ticket of Jamiat Ulema-e-Islam (F). He won the election by the majority of 6,074 votes over the runner up Abid Rehman of Pakistan Tehreek-e-Insaf. He garnered 18,102 votes while Rehman received 12,028 votes.

References

Living people
Jamiat Ulema-e-Islam (F) politicians
Politicians from Khyber Pakhtunkhwa
Year of birth missing (living people)